Hubacher is a surname. Notable people with the surname include:

Edy Hubacher (born 1940), Swiss sportsman
Helmut Hubacher (1926–2020), Swiss politician
Max Hubacher (born 1993), Swiss actor